H. P. Jacobs may refer to:

 Hedley Powell Jacobs (1904–1989), English–Jamaican author
 Henry P. Jacobs (1825–1899), American legislator and educator